The Forbidden Apple Stakes is a Grade III American Thoroughbred horse race for horses aged four years old and older held over a distance of one mile (8 furlongs) on the turf held annually in mid-July at Saratoga Race Course in Saratoga Springs, New York.In 2023 NYRA announced that the event would be renamed to the Kelso Stakes.

History

The event is named in honor of Forbidden Apple who won the 2001 Grade I Manhattan Handicap and won the Grade II Kelso Handicap twice.

The event's inaugural running was on Independence Day in 2014 at Belmont Park in Elmont, New York as the seventh race on the ten race holiday card and was won by Shadwell Stable's Sayaad who defeated the favorite Kharafa in a five horse field by  lengths in a time of 1:38.27 on a soft yielding turf track.

From 2014 until 2018 the event was held at Belmont Park.

In 2019 the event was moved to Saratoga. That same year the event was classified as Grade III by the  Thoroughbred Owners and Breeders Association.

In 2020 due to the COVID-19 pandemic in the United States, NYRA did not schedule the event in their Saratoga summer meeting.

Records
Speed record:
  	1:31.67  – Voodoo Song  (2018)

Margins:
 lengths – Disco Partner (2017)

Most wins:
 2 – King Kreesa  (2015, 2016)

Most wins by an owner:
 2 – Gerald & Susan Kresa  (2015, 2016)

Most wins by a jockey:
 2 – José L. Ortiz (2014, 2017)
 2 – Irad Ortiz Jr. (2015, 2016)

Most wins by a trainer:
 2 – David G. Donk: (2015, 2016)
 2 – Christophe Clement: (2017, 2022)

Winners

See also
 List of American and Canadian Graded races

References

Graded stakes races in the United States
Turf races in the United States
Open mile category horse races
Recurring sporting events established in 2014
Saratoga Race Course
2014 establishments in New York (state)
Grade 3 stakes races in the United States